Augsburger may refer to:

People with the surname
David Augsburger, American Anabaptist author
Gaetan Augsburger (born 1988), Swiss ice hockey player
John Augsburger (born 1940), American former politician from the state of Indiana
Myron Augsburger (born 1929), American Mennonite pastor, professor, theologian, and author

Other uses
Augsburg, a city in Swabia, Bavaria, Germany
Augsburger, an endangered German breed of domestic chicken, originating in Augsburg
Augsburger Schrift, a blackletter typeface by Art Nouveau illustrator Peter Schnorr.

See also
Augsburger Allgemeine, major German regional daily newspaper
Augsburger Interim, imperial decree ordered on 15 May 1548 by Charles V, Holy Roman Emperor
Der Augsburger Kreidekreis, short story written in 1940 by Bertolt Brecht
Augsburger Panther, professional ice hockey team
Augsburger Puppenkiste, marionette theater in Augsburg
Ralphi – Der Schlaubär aus der Augsburger Puppenkiste, German television series
Augsburger Rathaus, Augsburg Town Hall
Augsburger Religionsfrieden, a 1555 treaty between Charles V, Holy Roman Emperor and the Schmalkaldic League
Augsburger Straße (Berlin U-Bahn), station on the U3 line